Poshteh Qaleh (also Romanized as Poshteh Qal‘eh; also known as Posht Qal‘eh and Qal‘eh-ye Dahaneh-ye Shūr) is a village in Golashkerd Rural District, in the Central District of Faryab County, Kerman Province, Iran. At the 2006 census, its population was 196, in 40 families.

References 

Populated places in Faryab County